This is a list of major stock exchanges. Those futures exchanges that also offer trading in securities besides trading in futures contracts are listed both here and in the list of futures exchanges.

There are sixteen stock exchanges in the world that have a market capitalization of over US$1 trillion each. They are sometimes referred to as the "$1 Trillion Club". These exchanges accounted for 87% of global market capitalization in 2016. Some exchanges do include companies from outside the country where the exchange is located.

Major stock exchanges
Major stock exchange groups (the current top 20 by market capitalization) of issued shares of listed companies ("MIC" = market identifier code)

* Note: "Δ" to UTC, as well as "Open (UTC)" and "Close (UTC)" columns contain valid data only for standard time in a given time zone. During daylight saving time period, the UTC times will be one hour less and Δs one hour more.
**Applicable for non-closing auction session shares only.

Stock exchanges by continent

Africa

Americas

Asia

Europe

Oceania

See also

 Federation of Euro-Asian Stock Exchanges
 List of countries by stock market capitalization
 List of countries without a stock exchange
 List of futures exchanges

References

External links
 Official website of World Federation of Exchanges

 
Lists by country